Alireza Nadi (born September 2, 1980) is a former volleyball player from Iran, who played as a middle-blocker for the Men's National Team of the year 2003–2012.

Honours

National team
Asian Championship
Gold  medal (1): 2011
Silver medal (1): 2009
Bronze medal (1): 2003
Asian Games
Silver medal (1): 2010
AVC Cup
Gold medal (2): 2008, 2010
West Asian Games
Silver medal (1): 2005
Islamic Solidarity Games
Gold medal (1): 2005
Asian Junior Championship
Gold medal (1): 1998

Club
Asian Championship
Gold medal (6): 2004 (Sanam), 2006, 2007, 2008, 2009, 2011 (Paykan)
Silver medal (1): 2002 (Sanam)
Bronze medal (1): 2012 (Kalleh)
Iranian Super League
Champions (6): 2001, 2002, 2004, 2005 (Sanam), 2009 (Paykan), 2012 (Kalleh)

Individual
MVP: 1998 Asian Junior Championship
Best Blocker: 2008 Asian Club Championship
Best Blocker: 2010 AVC Cup

External links
 FIVB biography

1985 births
Living people
Iranian men's volleyball players
Asian Games silver medalists for Iran
Asian Games medalists in volleyball
Volleyball players at the 2006 Asian Games
Volleyball players at the 2010 Asian Games
People from Tehran
Medalists at the 2010 Asian Games
Islamic Solidarity Games competitors for Iran